L. Norbert Thériault (February 16, 1921 – June 19, 2016) was a Canadian politician.

He was born in Eel River Bridge, New Brunswick, Canada. He represented Northumberland (1960–1974) and Baie-du-Vin (1974–1979) in the Legislative Assembly of New Brunswick, and was a provincial cabinet minister in New Brunswick in the 1960s.
He was appointed to the Senate of Canada on March 26, 1979 on the advice of then-Prime Minister Pierre Elliott Trudeau, and served until his 75th birthday on February 16, 1996.

His son Camille Thériault also served a member of the Legislative Assembly of New Brunswick, and was premier of New Brunswick from May 14, 1998 until June 21, 1999.

Thériault died on June 19, 2016.

References 

Legislative Assembly of New Brunswick Journals

1921 births
2016 deaths
Canadian senators from New Brunswick
Liberal Party of Canada senators
New Brunswick Liberal Association MLAs